In the mathematical field of functional analysis, the space denoted by c is the vector space of all convergent sequences  of real numbers or complex numbers.  When equipped with the uniform norm:

the space  becomes a Banach space. It is a closed linear subspace of the space of bounded sequences, and contains as a closed subspace the Banach space  of sequences converging to zero.

This is the Riesz representation theorem on the ordinal 

See also

References

 .

Banach spaces
Functional analysis
Normed spaces
Norms (mathematics)